HD 102839 is a class G6Ib (yellow supergiant) star in the constellation Musca. Its apparent magnitude is 4.98 and it is approximately 1,550 light years away from Earth based on parallax.

References

Musca (constellation)
G-type supergiants
102839
4538
057696
PD-69 01595